Show Me is the fifth extended play by South Korean girl group Momoland. The EP was released by MLD Entertainment and distributed Kakao M on March 20, 2019. For the extended play, Momoland worked with a variety of producers including Shinsadong Tiger, Byun Moo Hyuk, Pinkmoon, Beverly Kids, Big Bread and Judy. Show Me consists of six tracks including the single "I'm So Hot" and its instrumental, and four other new tracks.

To promote the extended play, the group performed on several South Korean music show programs, such as M Countdown and Inkigayo. Commercially, the album peaked at number seven on South Korea's Gaon Album Chart. Members Daisy and Taeha didn't take part in the extended play due to health and personal reasons. The EP also marked as Yeonwoo's final comeback with the group.

Background and release 
On February 12, 2019, it was announced that the group will release a new album in March, almost nine month after their latest album. On March 6, it was announced that the group will release a new mini album on March 20. On March 13, MLD Entertainment announced that the group will return with seven members, while members Daisy and Taeha will not take part due to health and personal reasons, and will rejoin the group in the future 

The extended play was released on March 20, 2019, by MLD Entertainment and Kakao M as a digital download through several music portals, including MelOn and Apple Music.

Commercial performance 
In South Korea, the extended play debuted at number seven on the Gaon Album Chart for the week ending March 23, 2019. In its second week, it fell to number twenty-seven and to number sixty-five in its third week. It was the thirty-first most selling album on the Gaon Album Chart for the month of March 2019, with 9,153 copies sold.

Track listing

Charts

Credits and personnel
Credits adapted from Melon.
 Momoland – vocals 
 AlLike – arrangement 
 Beom x Nang – lyricist , composer 
 Beverly Kidz – lyricist , composer , arrangement 
 Big Bread – lyricist , composer , arrangement 
 Byun Moo Hyuk – lyricist , composer , arrangement 
 Judy – lyricist , composer , arrangement 
 Pinkmoon – lyricist , composer , arrangement 
 Yoon Seok – lyricist , composer 
 Shinsadong Tiger – lyricist , composer , arrangement

Release history

References 

Momoland albums
2019 EPs